Mitchell Gale (born January 7, 1990) is a former American football quarterback. He played college football at Abilene Christian University and attended Alva High School in Alva, Oklahoma. Gale has been a member of the Toronto Argonauts, Hamilton Tiger-Cats, Saskatchewan Roughriders, Calgary Stampeders and BC Lions of the Canadian Football League (CFL).

College career
Gale was a four-year starter at Abilene Christian University. He threw for 97 touchdowns and over 12,000 career yards. Gale and former ACU quarterback Billy Malone became just the third pair of teammates to throw for over 12,000 yards.

Professional career

Gale attended rookie mini-camp with the St. Louis Rams of the National Football League in May 2013.

Toronto Argonauts
Gale was signed by the Toronto Argonauts on May 16, 2013. He was released by the Argonauts on September 2, 2015.

Hamilton Tiger-Cats
Gale signed with the Hamilton Tiger-Cats on November 3, 2015.

Toronto Argonauts (second stint)
Gale was signed by the Toronto Argonauts on June 10, 2016.

Saskatchewan Roughriders
On July 2, 2016, Gale and Matt Sewell were traded to the Saskatchewan Roughriders for Shawn Lemon and a conditional 2018 CFL Draft pick. In Week 4 starting quarterback Darian Durant left the game in the early second quarter, thrusting Mitchell Gale into the starting role. Gale made his first career CFL start on July 22, throwing for 354 yards and one touchdown in a come-from-behind victory at home over the Ottawa Redblacks, which was the Roughriders' first win of the 2016 campaign. Gale would also start the following week before Durant returned from his leg injury. Having been eliminated from playoff contention the Riders started Gale at quarterback for the final week of the season. He finished the season having completed 79 out of 137 pass attempts (58%) for 937 yards with 2 touchdowns and 3 interceptions. On January 27, 2017, about two weeks before becoming a free agent, Gale was released by the Riders along with three of his teammates.

BC Lions 
After spending a better part of the 2017 CFL season on the bench for the BC Lions, the organization parted ways with Gale despite never taking an in-game rep for the team.

References

External links
Just Sports Stats
Toronto Argonauts profile

Living people
1990 births
American football quarterbacks
Canadian football quarterbacks
American players of Canadian football
Abilene Christian Wildcats football players
Toronto Argonauts players
Hamilton Tiger-Cats players
Saskatchewan Roughriders players
Calgary Stampeders players
BC Lions players
Players of American football from Oklahoma
People from Alva, Oklahoma